William Derby (fl. 1404) was a Member of Parliament for Reading in 1404.

References

14th-century births
15th-century deaths
15th-century English people
English MPs January 1404
Members of the Parliament of England (pre-1707) for Reading